is a Japanese short track speed skater. He competed in three events at the 1994 Winter Olympics.

References

1972 births
Living people
Japanese male short track speed skaters
Olympic short track speed skaters of Japan
Short track speed skaters at the 1994 Winter Olympics
People from Gifu
Asian Games medalists in short track speed skating
Short track speed skaters at the 1990 Asian Winter Games
Medalists at the 1990 Asian Winter Games
Asian Games bronze medalists for Japan